The 2016 Charlottesville Men's Pro Challenger was a professional tennis tournament played on indoor hard courts. It was the eighth edition of the tournament which was part of the 2016 ATP Challenger Tour, taking place in Charlottesville, United States from October 31 to November 6, 2016.

Singles main-draw entrants

Seeds

 1 Rankings are as of October 24, 2016.

Other entrants
The following players received wildcards into the singles main draw:
  Mackenzie McDonald
  Alexander Ritschard
  Ryan Shane
  Carl Söderlund
 
The following players received entry from the qualifying draw:
  JC Aragone
  Yuki Bhambri
  Gonzales Austin
  Thai-Son Kwiatkowski

Champions

Singles

 Reilly Opelka def.  Ruben Bemelmans, 6–4, 2–6, 7–6(7–5).

Doubles

 Brian Baker /  Sam Groth def.  Brydan Klein /  Ruan Roelofse, 6–3, 6–3.

Charlottesville Men's Pro Challenger
Charlottesville Men's Pro Challenger
Charlottesville Men's Pro Challenger
Charlottesville Men's Pro Challenger